José Ramón Gonzalez Arrieta (born 12 May 1967 in Bilbao) is a Spanish former road bicycle racer. He is the husband of former road bicycle racer Joane Somarriba Arrola.

Major results

1990
6th Overall Tour of Galicia
8th Overall Vuelta a Cantabria
1993
9th La Flèche Wallonne
1994
3rd Subida a Urkiola
1995
1st Classique des Alpes
7th Overall Route du Sud
1996
2nd Subida al Naranco
1998
8th Overall Vuelta a Asturias
2000
5th Overall Route du Sud
5th Classique des Alpes
10th Overall Critérium du Dauphiné Libéré
2001
9th Overall Critérium du Dauphiné Libéré

External links

Palmares by cyclingbase.com

1967 births
Cyclists from the Basque Country (autonomous community)
Spanish male cyclists
Living people
Sportspeople from Bilbao